Pablo Armando Esono Edjo (born 10 June 1986), better known as Justice, is an Equatoguinean retired footballer who played as a striker. He was a member of the Equatorial Guinea national team.

International career

International goals

Honours

International 

 CEMAC Cup
Winner (1): 2006

External links

1986 births
Living people
Sportspeople from Malabo
Equatoguinean footballers
Equatorial Guinea international footballers
Equatoguinean expatriate footballers
Expatriate footballers in Sweden
Allsvenskan players
Malmö FF players
Equatoguinean expatriate sportspeople in Spain
Expatriate footballers in Spain
Expatriate soccer players in the United States
Association football forwards